The Gatineau Satellite Station  is a Canadian satellite station located in Cantley near Gatineau , in the province of Québec.  Like the Prince Albert Radar Laboratory, it was originally a military Radar station, operated by the Canadian Defence Research Telecommunications Establishment (DRTE),  a division of the Canadian Defense Research Board. With the two satellites / radar stations, it is possible to monitor the whole airspace over Canada, as well as parts from the USA and Alaska.

Tasks and equipment 
The plant, which is still operated today, is primarily used as an earth station. It has a large factory building and a 13-meter-diameter satellite antenna, replacing two old 10-meter-diameter antennas in June 2014.

Used as earth station for the following satellites:
Formerly:
 ERS-2
 Envisat
 RADARSAT-1
Current:
 Landsat 7
 RADARSAT-2
 RADARSAT Constellation

References

External links 
 Gatineau Satellite Station

Space program of Canada
Outaouais